Lomlom Airport is an airport serving Lomlom, in the Reef Islands, in the Solomon Islands . The airport opened in 2018.

Airlines and destinations

References

External links
Solomon Airlines Routes

Airports in the Solomon Islands